The men's double trap competition at the 2004 Summer Olympics was held on August 17 at the Markópoulo Olympic Shooting Centre near Athens, Greece. 

The event consisted of two rounds: a qualifier and a final. In the qualifier, each shooter fired 3 sets of 50 shots in trap shooting. Shots were paired, with two targets being launched at a time.

The top 6 shooters in the qualifying round moved on to the final round. There, they fired one additional round of 50. The total score from all 200 shots was used to determine final ranking. Ties are broken using a shoot-off; additional shots are fired one pair at a time until there is no longer a tie.

Ahmed Al Maktoum, a member of Dubai's royal family, set a historic milestone for the United Arab Emirates by picking up the nation's first ever gold medal in Olympic history, breaking a new Olympic record of 179 in the qualification round and increased his six-point lead to a ten-point post-final victory margin at 189. India's Rajyavardhan Singh Rathore, who finished fifth earlier in the prelims with 135, shot steadily in the final round to grab the silver with 179, while China's Wang Zheng scored 178 to edge out his teammate Hu Binyuan for the bronze by a single hit.

Defending Olympic champion Richard Faulds failed to reach the final round after a dismal display in the prelims, posting a total record of 130 out of 150 to finish thirteenth in a field of twenty-five shooters.

Records
Prior to this competition, the existing world and Olympic records were as follows.

Qualification round

 Equalled Olympic record – Q Qualified for final

Final

 Equalled Olympic record

References

External links
Official Results

Men's Double Trap
Men's events at the 2004 Summer Olympics